Óscar Ramírez Durán (born 16 March 1953), commonly known as Comrade Feliciano, is a Peruvian convicted terrorist and former political leader who led the Shining Path, a Marxist–Leninist–Maoist terrorist group in Peru, in the 1990s.

Biography 
Ramírez is the son of a retired Peruvian general and the second of seven brothers. Being studious from a young age and enjoying mental challenges such as chess, Ramírez was awarded the medal of academic excellence from the College of Saint Francis of Assisi in Arequipa, Peru.

Capture and imprisonment 
Ramírez assumed control of the Shining Path after Abimael Guzmán was captured by the authorities in 1992. Ramírez himself was captured in 1999 and sentenced to life imprisonment. He would be granted a retrial in 2004.

In June 2006, Ramírez was sentenced to 24 years in prison for the crimes he committed during the internal conflict in Peru. He is currently being held at the naval base in Callao.

His reduced sentence was a result of his collaboration with Peruvian authorities and enmity with Guzmán: in 2003 he described him to the Caretas magazine as a "psychopath" and stated that "He (Guzmán) was always a coward and a traitor". He went as far as declaring, before the Truth and Reconciliation Commission his renewed belief in democracy, his call for remaining subversives to lay down arms, his expectation for new civilian trials and his condolences for the victims of the conflict. Caretas has also published extracts from his conversations with the former head of the Peruvian National Intelligence Service, Vladimiro Montesinos in which family links with the terrorist emerged, both being cousins.

In March 2013, he testified in the trial of the recently imprisoned leader, Comrade Artemio. During the audience, he apologized to the country for the crimes committed by Shining Path.

References

Living people
1953 births
People convicted on terrorism charges
People imprisoned for terrorism
Peruvian criminals
Peruvian communists
Members of the Shining Path
Peruvian prisoners and detainees
Prisoners and detainees of Peru
Peruvian revolutionaries